Porter is an unincorporated community in New Castle County, Delaware, United States. Porter is located at the intersection of Porter Road and Old Porter Road, southwest of Bear, and is the location of a junction between the Norfolk Southern Railway and the Delmarva Central Railroad.

References 

Unincorporated communities in New Castle County, Delaware
Unincorporated communities in Delaware